"Exterminate!" is a song by German Eurodance group Snap! featuring American singer Niki Haris. It was released in December 1992, as the third single from their second studio album, The Madman's Return (1992), and features vocals by the group's new front woman, Haris. It is based on the track "Ex-Terminator" and was included in later editions of the album. Released first at the end of 1992, it was a hit in several countries, peaking at number-one in Finland and Spain, and number two in the United Kingdom, where it spent 15 weeks on the charts.

A popular version of the song, came from a duet recorded by F. Michael Sky and Farmer Murray in 2003. Critics acclaimed the track as it climbed to the top five songs in Switzerland.

Critical reception
Larry Flick from Billboard commented that here, the "former Madonna backing singer steps into the spotlight as the German act's new (at least for the moment) front woman. Electronic hip hop beats are doused with ambient sound effects, while Haris offers an appropriately ominous and forceful vocal. Not as radio-friendly as the previous "Rhythm Is a Dancer", but a savvy club entry that should glide onto playlists." In his weekly UK chart commentary, James Masterton said, "Its chart success so far is somewhat of a surprise being, aside from the one vocal line, almost an instrumental and certainly with little of the quirky appeal of the earlier singles."

Pan-European magazine Music & Media wrote that it "might not be as accessible on first hearing, but it's actually a killer dance song which chokes you with its chorus with built-in snappy piano riff." A reviewer from Music Week stated that "the trance-like tune builds and builds from a five note riff, while new vocalist Niki Harris manages to fill in some soulful wailing as well as the Dalek's catchphrase. The song hasn't got the same killer pop chorus as "Rhythm Is a Dancer", but its sheer simplicity will win the day." Mark Sutherland from Smash Hits gave the song three out of five in his review.

Chart performance
"Exterminate!" went on becoming very successful on the charts in Europe, peaking at number-one in Finland and Spain. It entered the top 5 also in Belgium (3), Denmark (5), Germany (3), Greece (2), Ireland (2), Italy (3), the Netherlands (4), Switzerland (2) and the United Kingdom, as well as on the Eurochart Hot 100, where it reached number two. In the UK, the song also peaked at number two in its second week at the UK Singles Chart, on January 10, 1993. It was held off reaching the top spot by Whitney Houston's "I Will Always Love You" and stayed at number two for three weeks. Additionally, "Exterminate!" reached the top 10 also in Austria (9), Norway (9) and Portugal (10). Outside Europe, it went to number two on the RPM Dance/Urban chart in Canada, number six in Zimbabwe, number 25 in New Zealand, number 29 on the Billboard Dance Club Songs chart in the US and number 50 in Australia. 

In Germany, the single was awarded with a gold record after 250,000 units were sold.

Music video
The accompanying music video for "Exterminate!" was directed by Angel, who had previously directed the video for "Colour of Love". This was the first video that Durron Butler (Turbo B) does not appear. It received heavy rotation on MTV Europe and was later published on Snap!'s official YouTube channel in May 2011. As of December 2022, the video had generated more than 1,5 million views.

Track listings

 7" single
 Ex-terminator (album version) — 5:21
 Exterminate!  (endzeit 7" mix) — 4:13

 12" single
 Exterminate!  (endzeit 12") — 6:45
 Exterminate!  (A.C.II 12") — 7:44

 CD single
 Ex-terminator (album version) — 5:21
 Exterminate!  (endzeit 7" mix) — 4:13

 CD maxi
 Exterminate!  (endzeit 7") — 4:13
 Exterminate!  (A.C.II 12") — 7:44
 Ex-terminator (album version) — 5:21

Charts and sales

Weekly charts

Year-end charts

Certifications

References

1992 singles
1993 singles
1992 songs
English-language German songs
Logic Records singles
Music videos directed by Angel (director)
Music Week number-one dance singles
Number-one singles in Finland
Number-one singles in Spain
Snap! songs